CIOS may refer to:

Cisco IOS, software used on routers and network switches
Cyprus-Israel Optical System, a cable system linking Cyprus and Israel
Channel Islands Occupation Society, a military history organisation
Combined Intelligence Objectives Subcommittee, an organization gathering technical intelligence in Germany after WW2
CIOS-FM 98.5 FM - A radio station licensed to Stephenville, NL